Sow the Seeds of Hemp is a 1976 novel by Gary Jennings. It tells the story of two men, Virgil Stewart and John Murrell, both former members of the same outlaw gang, as one risks his life to bring the other to justice.

Reception
Kirkus Reviews considered it to be "(a) true story as authentic as a hanging", but less funny than Jennings' earlier novel The Terrible Teague Bunch.

The New York Times called it "entertaining"; however, People noted that it "flopped".

References

1976 novels
Novels by Gary Jennings